Grise is a French surname. Notable people with the surname include:

 Richard Grisé (1944), Canadian politician
 Virginia Grise (1976), American writer
 Yolande Grisé (1944), Canadian historian

French-language surnames
Surnames from nicknames